Azna Mehalmak (also Romanized as Āznā Mehalmaḵ; also known as Aznā, Azdā, Eznā, Eznā Khvājeh, and Eznā Shahāb) is a village in Borborud-e Sharqi Rural District, in the Central District of Aligudarz County, Lorestan Province, Iran. At the 2006 census, its population was 517, in 97 families.

References 

Towns and villages in Aligudarz County